Israel Zviti (born 15 January 1980) is a retired Israeli footballer who now works as a scout for Maccabi Netanya.

Honours
Israeli Youth Championship:
Winner (1): 1994-95
Youth State Cup:
Winner (1): 1996
Israeli Second Division:
Winner (1): 1998-99
Runner-up (2): 2004-05, 2007–08
Toto Cup (Leumit):
Winner (2): 2004-05, 2007–08
Israeli Premier League:
Runner-up (1): 2006-07

Club career statistics
(correct as of March 2011)

References

External links
 Profile on One.co.il
 

1980 births
Living people
Israeli footballers
Maccabi Netanya F.C. players
Hapoel Petah Tikva F.C. players
Hapoel Kfar Saba F.C. players
Hapoel Nir Ramat HaSharon F.C. players
Maccabi HaShikma Ramat Hen F.C. players
Israeli Premier League players
Footballers from Netanya
Association football midfielders